"Nothing Happens", also called "Nothing can happen to you, too", or "Marijuana can make nothing happen to you, too", was an anti-cannabis public service announcement created by the United States Office of National Drug Control Policy (ONDCP).

Description
The black-and-white PSA shows two friends sharing a joint in a dark room with a single window backlighting them. The room turns out to belong to one of the friends' parents, in their house where the friends have lived for "what, fifteen years?" one of them guesses. One friend sarcastically says to the other "Marijuana can mess you up," and asks if has yet gotten the other to "get into other drugs and
start mugging people." The interlocutor answers "Nah, I didn't do anything. In fact, I'd say I'm exactly the
same as when I smoked my first joint." An off-screen voice is heard to say "Eddie, did you even look
for a job today?" to which he replies "No, ma." while quickly trying to conceal evidence of drug use. The scene fades out and the words "Nothing happens with marijuana" appear above "Partnership for a Drug-Free America" with a voice-over "Marijuana can make nothing happen to you, too."

Academic research

The campaign is notable for having been assessed in a 1999 controlled media research study, followed up by further research in 2008, to be a specific example of a PSA that actually increased teen use of cannabis by showing that it is "healthy experimentation, interesting to try, fun, and normal". Other ONDCP public service announcements are said by researchers to have had the same boomerang effect on cannabis consumption. A review of the 1999 study stated:

Other reactions
Author Tamim Ansary cited the ad, withdrawn from television "right away", as a counterpoint to anti-drug propaganda when educating his own children.

Footnotes

References

Sources

External links

Anti-cannabis public service announcements
Public service announcements of the United States
American television commercials
1999 neologisms
American advertising slogans
Drug policy of the United States
History of drug control in the United States